is a Japanese actor and voice actor from Kagoshima Prefecture, Japan. He is affiliated with Mausu Promotion. As of March 9, 2015 he is officially married with voice actress, Nana Inoue.

Filmography

Anime
2004
Maria-sama ga Miteru as Yūki Fukuzawa→
Maria-sama ga Miteru: Printemps as Yūki Fukuzawa
School Rumble as Hiroyoshi Asō
2005
The Law of Ueki as Yasokichi Yamada
2006
Magikano as Haruo Yoshikawa
School Rumble: 2nd Semester as Hiroyoshi Asō
2008
Hyakko as Kitsune Kageyama
Porphy no Nagai Tabi as Monk
S · A: Special A as Atsushi Hanazono, Oogawara (ep 1–2)
2009
Inuyasha: Kanketsu-hen as Shishinki's messenger
Maria-sama ga Miteru 4th Season as Yūki Fukuzawa
Sora o Kakeru Shōjo as Yubi-tan
Tayutama: Kiss on my Deity as Hou
2010
Angel Beats! as Takeyama
Astro Fighter Sunred as Night Owl (Night Man)
Dance in the Vampire Bund as Hikosaka
Kaichō wa Maid-sama! as Naoya Shirakawa
2011
Bleach as Yukio Hans Vorarlberna
Fractale as Young man (ep 6)
Freezing as Kazuya Aoi
I Don't Like You at All, Big Brother!! as Daigo Kurosaki
Euphoria as Takatou Keisuke
2012
Another as Tomohiko Kazami
2013
Freezing Vibration as Kazuya Aoi
Hetalia the Beautiful World as Picardy (ep 11)
2015
Hetalia: World Twinkle as Kugelmugel
2016
Norn9 as Setsu Takishima
Touken Ranbu: Hanamaru as Yamatonokami Yasusada
2017
My Girlfriend Is Shobitch as Haruka Shinozaki
Osake wa Fūfu ni Natte kara as Sora Mizusawa
Yowamushi Pedal New Generation as Sadatoki Sugimoto
2018
Zoku Touken Ranbu: Hanamaru as Yamatonokami Yasusada
Crossing Time as Takashi Komaba
2019
Yatogame-chan Kansatsu Nikki as Kaito Jin
Demon Slayer: Kimetsu no Yaiba as Shoichi
Vinland Saga as Ari
2020
Yatogame-chan Kansatsu Nikki 2 Satsume as Kaito Jin
A3! as Haruto Asuka
Dorohedoro as Professor Kasukabe
2021
Yatogame-chan Kansatsu Nikki 3 Satsume as Kaito Jin
2022
Sasaki and Miyano as Gonsaburō Tashiro
Yatogame-chan Kansatsu Nikki 4 Satsume as Kaito Jin

Original video animation (OVA)
Kokoro Connect: Michi Random as Shouto Shiroyama 
Maria-sama ga Miteru 3rd Season as Yūki Fukuzawa
School Rumble: Extra Class as Hiroyoshi Asō

Tokusatsu
Samurai Sentai Shinkenger as Ayakashi Marigomori (ep 16)

Video games
Akane-sasu Sekai de Kimi to Utau as Sugita Genpaku
Atelier Meruru: The Apprentice of Arland as Lias Falken
BlazBlue: Chronophantasma as Hibiki Kohaku
Desert Kingdom as Legetta
Desert Kingdom Portable as Legetta  
Fire Emblem Awakening as Denis
Fire Emblem Fates as Hinata, Hisame
Root Double: Before Crime * After Days as Natsuhiko Tenkawa
OZMAFIA!! as Scarlet
PaniPani-パラレルニクスパンドラナイト as Karyuu Hunt
Pokémon GO as Shellder and Cloyster
Tokimeki Memorial Girl's Side 3rd Story as Oosako Chikara
Tokimeki Memorial Girl's Side Premium: 3rd Story as Osako Chikara
Mugen Souls Z as Kakeru
Tōken Ranbu as Yamatonokami Yasusada
Show by Rock!! as Yaiba
Norn9 as Setsu Takishima

References

External links
 Official blog 
 Mitsuhiro Ichiki at GamePlaza-Haruka Voice Acting Database 
 Mitsuhiro Ichiki at Hitoshi Doi's Seiyuu Database 
 

1982 births
Living people
Japanese male video game actors
Japanese male voice actors
Male voice actors from Kagoshima Prefecture
Mausu Promotion voice actors
21st-century Japanese male actors